The Count of Sabugosa, was a title created by letter on 19 September 1729 by King John V of Portugal for Vasco Fernandes César de Meneses and his descendants. 

After the founding of the First Portuguese Republic (1910-1926) and the end of noble titles, the successors became pretenders to the title.

List of counts

 Vasco Fernandes César de Meneses, 1st Count of Sabugosa
 Luís César de Meneses, 2nd Count of Sabugosa
 Mariana Rosa de Lancastre, 3rd Count of Sabugosa
 Ana de Melo da Silva César de Meneses, 4th Count of Sabugosa
 D. António Maria de Melo da Silva César de Meneses, 5th Count of Sabugosa
 D. José António de Melo da Silva César de Meneses, 6th Count of Sabugosa
 D. António José de Melo da Silva César de Meneses, 7th Count of Sabugosa
 D. António Maria José de Melo da Silva César e Meneses, 8th Count of Sabugosa
 D. António Maria Vasco de Melo Silva César e Meneses, 9th Count of Sabugosa

References

Sabugosa
1729 establishments in Portugal